Nicola Fergola (1753–1824) was an Italian mathematician, professor in the University of Naples.

Life and work 

Fergola studied in the Jesuit school;    he then  went to the university of Naples in 1667, but he studied mathematics by his own because the university was only strong in law and medicine. From 1770 he was teaching, by royal appointment, in the Liceo del Salvatore, a school founded in the same building where the Jesuit school had been (the Jesuit order was suppressed three years before).

In 1799, during the Napoleonic period, he lived in Capodimonte but, when the Borbonic monarchy was restated, he was appointed to the mathematics chair in the Neapolitan university.

In 1821 he suffered a stroke which left him disabled for the rest of his life.

Fergola was one of the protagonists of an ideological quarrel among the Neapolitan scientists at the end of 18th  and the first half of the 19th  century. In the field of mathematics, the quarrel was about the use of synthetic or analytic methods. These polemics were coincident with the politically conservative conceptions of the former and the progressive views of the followers of the analytic method.

The Borbonic restoration in the kingdom of the Two Sicilies, with his ultraconservative profile, made possible the maintenance of this school until the Risorgimento, but at the end of 19th century it was absolutely forgotten. To see a taste of the quarrel, here are the words pronounced by Gioacchino Ventura di Raulica in the obituary of Nicola Fergola:

The only work of Fergola is Prelezioni sui Principi matematici della filosofia naturale del cavalier Isacco Newton, published in two volumes in 1792 and 1793. It is interesting to see the religious point of view of the Newtonian force concept.

This religious conception is seen in all of Fergola's mathematical works. In 1839, was published Fergola's manuscript entitled  Teorica de miracoli esposta con metodo dimostrativo in which Fergola tried to demonstrate the possibility of the miracles in a mathematical way: proposition, demonstration, theorem, lemma, scolium, i.e.

References

Bibliography

External links 
 
 

1753 births
1824 deaths
18th-century Italian people
18th-century Italian mathematicians